Genova is an extinct town in Livingston County, in the U.S. state of Missouri. The GNIS classifies it as a populated place.

The State Historical Society of Missouri speculates Genova derives its name from Geneva and/or Genoa. A post office called Genova was established in 1891, and remained in operation until 1901.

References

Ghost towns in Missouri
Former populated places in Livingston County, Missouri